Kayet Para Union is a union, the smallest administrative body of Bangladesh, located in Rupganj Upazila, Narayanganj District, Bangladesh. The total population is 64,650.

References

 Unions of Rupganj Upazila